Hawthorndale is a suburb of New Zealand's southernmost city, Invercargill. It contains the city's Eastern Cemetery, and also Bill Richardson Transport World, a truck and classic car museum.

Demographics

The statistical area had a population of 1,764 at the 2018 New Zealand census, an increase of 33 people (1.9%) since the 2013 census, and an increase of 39 people (2.3%) since the 2006 census. There were 696 households. There were 828 males and 933 females, giving a sex ratio of 0.89 males per female. The median age was 35.3 years (compared with 37.4 years nationally), with 336 people (19.0%) aged under 15 years, 396 (22.4%) aged 15 to 29, 813 (46.1%) aged 30 to 64, and 216 (12.2%) aged 65 or older.

Ethnicities were 85.5% European/Pākehā, 17.2% Māori, 3.4% Pacific peoples, 6.3% Asian, and 1.7% other ethnicities (totals add to more than 100% since people could identify with multiple ethnicities).

The proportion of people born overseas was 10.4%, compared with 27.1% nationally.

Although some people objected to giving their religion, 50.9% had no religion, 36.4% were Christian, 0.9% were Hindu, 0.5% were Muslim, 0.2% were Buddhist and 2.9% had other religions.

Of those at least 15 years old, 198 (13.9%) people had a bachelor or higher degree, and 336 (23.5%) people had no formal qualifications. The median income was $34,000, compared with $31,800 nationally. 204 people (14.3%) earned over $70,000 compared to 17.2% nationally. The employment status of those at least 15 was that 822 (57.6%) people were employed full-time, 204 (14.3%) were part-time, and 45 (3.2%) were unemployed.

Education
Ascot Community School is a full primary school serving years 1 to 8 with a roll of  students as of  The school was formed by the merger of Surrey Park and Hawthorndale Primary schools with Lithgow Intermediate. Lithgow Intermediate had merged with Cargill High School in 1997.

References

Suburbs of Invercargill